Vladimir Sergeyevich Basalayev (12 August 1945 – 28 March 2019) was a Soviet Russian football player.

International career
Basalayev made his debut for USSR on 16 June 1968 in a friendly against Austria.

References

External links
  Profile

1945 births
2019 deaths
Russian footballers
Association football defenders
Soviet footballers
Soviet Union international footballers
FC Lokomotiv Moscow players
FC Dynamo Moscow players
Soviet Top League players
Sportspeople from Kursk